The Ascension of the Lord Cathedral is a Romanian Orthodox cathedral in Târgu Mureș, Romania. It was built between 1925 and 1934 on the initiative of Archpriest Ștefan Rusu. As the seat of an archpriest and not a bishop, it is a church and not technically a cathedral, but is commonly referred to as such.

The Cathedral's cornerstone was laid on May 10, 1925, an event witnessed by, among others, the Minister of Religious Affairs, Alexandru Lapedatu, Bishop Nicolae Ivan, and Octavian Goga, who was a government minister at the time.

The cathedral was built according to the plans of architect Victor Vlad of the Politehnica University of Timișoara, in the form of a Greek cross. The total cost of the building was estimated at 20 million lei.

The iconostasis was built in 1934 by Traian Bobletec of Nazna, while the bells were cast at Timișoara. Due to lack of funding, murals of the interior were only completed in 1986.

External links

  Official site

Churches in Târgu Mureș
Romanian Orthodox churches in Mureș County
Churches completed in 1934
20th-century Eastern Orthodox church buildings
1934 establishments in Romania
Historic monuments in Mureș County